The first season of the Japanese animated television series A Certain Scientific Railgun, which is based on the manga of the same name, follows the third Level 5 esper in Academy City named Mikoto Misaka. Produced by J.C.Staff, the series was directed by Tatsuyuki Nagai from a series composition written by Seishi Minakami.

Rina Satō stars as Misaka, the character she previously voiced from A Certain Magical Index (2008), alongside Satomi Arai, Aki Toyosaki, and Kanae Itō, with Atsushi Abe reprising his role as Toma Kamijo. In March 2009, an anime adaptation of Motoi Fuyukawa's manga series was announced, with Nagai and Minakami joining the staff in June.

A Certain Scientific Railgun aired in Japan on October 2, 2009, consisting of twenty-four episodes, and concluded on March 19, 2010. A second season was announced in October 2012.


Episode list

Production

Development and writing
In March 2009, a flyer announced the anime television series adaptation of Motoi Fuyukawa's manga series A Certain Scientific Railgun. The final episode's ending of A Certain Magical Index (2008) confirmed that the series was greenlit. In June 2009, Tatsuyuki Nagai joined the staff at J.C.Staff as the director, along with Seishi Minakami as the series composition writer and Yuichi Tanaka as the character animation designer. Rina Satō, the voice of Mikoto Misaka, revealed that the series would explore her character's daily life and her interaction with other characters aside Toma Kamijo, the main character of A Certain Magical Index franchise. The series would also explore the science side since Index mainly focused on the magic side. With the Railgun series, Satomi Arai, the voice of Kuroko Shirai, hoped that her character and Misaka would have more interaction than what they had in Index.

Casting
In June 2009, Satō, Arai, and Atsushi Abe were confirmed to be reprising their respective roles from A Certain Magical Index as Misaka, Shirai, and Kamijo, along with Aki Toyosaki as Kazari Uiharu and Kanae Itō as Ruiko Saten.

Music

Maiko Iuchi was revealed to be composing the series in August 2009, after previously doing so for A Certain Magical Index (2008). A special ending theme music, titled "Smile: You & Me" by Elisa, was aired on episode 12. From episodes 15 onwards, the opening theme music is "Level 5 Judgelight" by fripSide, while the ending theme music is "Real Force" by Elisa.

Marketing
In August 2009, the official website of A Certain Scientific Railgun was launched, and a promotional video for the series was released.

Release

Broadcast
A Certain Scientific Railgun began airing in Japan on Tokyo MX on October 2, 2009, on Teletama, Chiba TV, MBS, and tvk on October 3, on AT-X on October 5, and on CBC on October 7. The season was also broadcast on Funimation Channel in the United States in 2013.

Home media

Geneon Universal Entertainment released eight Blu-ray and DVD volumes of the series in Japan starting January 29, 2010. Each volume contains a bonus novel written by Kazuma Kamachi titled A Certain Magical Index SS: Kaori Kanzaki, which follows one of the most powerful Saint named Kaori Kanzaki. The fifth volume is bundled with an episode of the bonus anime Much More Railgun.

In December 2016, Crunchyroll added the series to their catalog. Hulu released the series in Japan on March 24, 2022, while Muse Asia began streaming it on their official YouTube channel on May 13.

Reception

Critical response
Theron Martin of Anime News Network graded A Certain Scientific Railgun 'B', feeling that it was a "fun and engaging series that effectively mixes comedy, action, and some more serious elements and can stand plenty well on its own". He lauded the cast and lack of "preachiness" that A Certain Magical Index became the "biggest downfall". Ian Wolf of Anime UK News gave the series 8 out of 10, finding it "funnier" than Index. Despite praising the creative team for getting the right balance of humor, he criticized the music, "badly written" plots, and villain that was "stereotypically evil rather than anything more subtle".

Accolade
Satomi Arai was nominated for Best Actress in Supporting Roles at the 5th Seiyu Awards for her role as Kuroko Shirai.

References

External links
  
 

2009 Japanese television seasons
A Certain Magical Index
A Certain Magical Index episode lists